Cameron Sinclair (born 16 November 1973) is a designer, writer and one of the pioneers in socially responsive architecture. He is founder of the Worldchanging Institute, a research institute based in Jerome, Arizona focused on innovative solutions to social and humanitarian crises and serves as pro bono executive director of Armory of Harmony, a US-based organization focused on smelting down decommissioned weapons into musical instruments.

In 1999 he co-founded Architecture for Humanity with Kate Stohr, a charitable organization that developed architectural solutions to humanitarian crises and brought professional design and construction services to communities in need. In May 2013 he stepped down from its board and in October 2013 resigned as its "chief eternal optimist"(CEO) and executive director. Sinclair worked as director of the Jolie-Pitt Foundation from November 2013 to December 2015 including overseeing construction of a children's hospital in Ethiopia.

He was head of social innovation and helped to develop the humanitarian programs at Airbnb. Projects included emergency short term housing for those displaced by man-made and natural disasters; livelihoods for vulnerable communities; Community-led adventure travel and rural revitalization.

In 2012 he founded Small Works, a for purpose design company which focuses on reconstruction and social impact projects. The organization is best known for its award-winning self built re-deployable structures, many of which were built as schools in Jordan by Syrian refugees and Jordanian engineers. Currently over 5000 children have been educated in these facilities. Sinclair partnered with MADE Collective to propose the world's first co-nation called Otra Nation and BorderBNB, a home-share platform for families separated by political conflict and natural disasters.

Education and personal life 
Sinclair was born and raised in South East London, England, and educated at Kingswood School, Bath. In the mid-1990s he trained as an architect at the University of Westminster and The Bartlett School of Architecture, University College London.  
Having developed an interest in social, cultural and humanitarian design, his postgraduate thesis focused on providing shelter to New York's homeless through sustainable, transitional housing. This thesis served as the basis for starting Architecture for Humanity. Architecture for Humanity was co-founded by Sinclair in 1999 and grew to include 90,000 design professionals, 5 regional offices around the globe and 70 independent city-based chapters. During his tenure over 2.8M people who now live, work, learn, gather and heal in spaces built by the organization. In 2008, the University of Westminster awarded Sinclair an honorary doctorate for his services to the profession.

Professional career 
After graduating from university in 1997, Sinclair moved to New York City, where he worked as a designer for Steve Blatz Architects, Christidis Lauster Radu Architects and Gensler.

On April 6, 1999, Sinclair co-founded Architecture for Humanity with Kate Stohr, a charitable organization which developed architecture and design solutions to humanitarian crises, and provides pro bono design and construction services to communities in need.  The organization worked in forty eight countries on projects ranging from school, health clinics, affordable housing and long-term sustainable reconstruction. Work has also included rebuilding after the 2011 tsunami in Japan, 2010 earthquakes in Haiti, Hurricane Katrina and the 2004 South Asia tsunami.

In 2006, Sinclair and Stohr published a compendium on socially conscious design, titled Design Like You Give A Damn: Architectural Responses to Humanitarian Crises (May 2006, Metropolis Books). In 2012 they released the follow-up, titled Design Like You Give A Damn [2]: Building Change From The Ground Up (May 2012, Abrams Books). Sinclair is a regular lecturer and visiting professor and has spoken at a number of international conferences on sustainable development and post disaster reconstruction. In the past few years he has taught in New Zealand, Spain, Japan and the United States. He is currently adjunct faculty at The New School in New York.

In May 2013, Sinclair stepped down from the Board of Directors and in October 2013 resigned from the organization. In the Mid-2015 the organization ceased operation, before relaunching as the Open Architecture Collaborative.

From November 2013 to December 2015, Sinclair worked for a private family foundation on health, education, conservation projects in Cambodia, Ethiopia and Namibia. In the fall of 2015 he began collaborating with Airbnb on rural revitalization and community driven development in Yoshino, Japan. During this time Sinclair co-designed and collaborated on Re:build, the world's first re-deployable building system. Currently 48 classrooms have been built by Syrian refugees in Jordan, providing access to education to over 5000 children.

In 2016 Sinclair joined Airbnb to lead social innovation and supported the humanitarian efforts at the company with a goal to create temporary housing for 100,000 people over the next 5 years.

Awards 
In 2004, Fortune Magazine named Cameron Sinclair as one of the Aspen Seven, seven people changing the world for the better. He was the recipient of the 2006 TED Prize and the 2005 RISD Emerging Designer of the Year. Along with co-founder Kate Stohr, was awarded the Wired Magazine 2006 Rave Award for Architecture for their work in responding to housing needs following Hurricane Katrina.

As a result of the TED Prize he and Stohr launched the Open Architecture Network, the worlds' first open source community dedicated to improving living conditions through innovative and sustainable design. In 2012 the Open Architecture Network merged with Worldchanging to expand its work to both the built and natural environment.

In August 2008 Architecture for Humanity and its co-founders Sinclair and Stohr were named as recipients of the Design Patron Award for the 2008 National Design Awards. In 2008 he appeared as one of CNNs Principal Voices as well the television series Iconoclasts alongside Cameron Diaz, airing on the Sundance Channel.

In 2009 Sinclair and Stohr were jointly awarded the Bicentenary Medal of the Royal Society of Arts for increasing people's resourcefulness. Sinclair was awarded the Pilosio Building Peace award in 2013 and as finalist of the World Design Impact Prize for 2016.

Sinclair was a Young Global Leader by the World Economic Forum and Senior Fellow of the Design Futures Council.

References

External links 
 
 
 Cameron Sinclair's 24 min TED Prize Talk at TED Conference (2006) Monterey, CA
 Pragmatic Experimentation: An interview with Cameron Sinclair
 Interview on CNET
 Wired Science Interview
 Cameron Sinclair interview

1973 births
Living people
Sustainability advocates
English designers
Alumni of University College London